The snow miner bee (Andrena nivalis) is a species of miner bee in the family Andrenidae. Another common name for this species is the snowy miner. It is found in North America.

References

Further reading

 
 

nivalis
Articles created by Qbugbot
Insects described in 1853